Eduardo Antônio dos Santos (2 February 1967), commonly known as Edu Manga, is a Brazilian former professional footballer who played as a midfielder. He was also part of Brazil's squad for the 1987 Copa América tournament.

Career statistics

Club
Source:

International
Source:

References

External links

1967 births
Living people
Association football midfielders
Brazilian footballers
Brazilian expatriate footballers
Brazil international footballers
Sociedade Esportiva Palmeiras players
Sport Club Corinthians Paulista players
Sport Club do Recife players
Clube Náutico Capibaribe players
Paraná Clube players
Figueirense FC players
Club Deportivo Universidad Católica footballers
Club América footballers
Real Valladolid players
CD Logroñés footballers
Shimizu S-Pulse players
La Liga players
Segunda División players
J1 League players
1987 Copa América players
Expatriate footballers in Chile
Expatriate footballers in Japan
Expatriate footballers in Spain
Expatriate footballers in Mexico
Expatriate footballers in Ecuador
People from Osasco
Footballers from São Paulo (state)